A Dangerous Foe is a 1913 American drama film featuring Harry Carey.

Cast
 Charles Hill Mailes as The Judge
 Harry Carey as The 'Bull'
 John T. Dillon as The 'Bull's Friend

See also
 List of American films of 1913
 Harry Carey filmography

External links

1913 films
American silent short films
American black-and-white films
1913 drama films
1913 short films
Films directed by Anthony O'Sullivan
Silent American drama films
1910s American films